A Family Matter may refer to:

A Family Matter (comics), a 1998 graphic novel by American cartoonist Will Eisner
"A Family Matter" (Gilmore Girls episode), an episode of the TV show Gilmore Girls

See also 

 Family Matters (disambiguation)